The  (English: 'Competition of cities and villages in Bloom') is a contest organised annually in France which aims to encourage communes to adopt and implement policies that improve the quality of life of their inhabitants and enhance their attractiveness to visitors through the provision and maintenance of green spaces and the enhancement of their natural environments. Successful communes are awarded the right to display a badge (showing from one to four flowers) on road signs and in other local promotional material.

The competition was created in 1959 by the French state and it is administered by a distinct national committee since 1972. This committee is still linked to the Ministry of Tourism. All the French communes can take part and there are no application fees. There is not any limitation to the number of awarded communes, so they are not in competition between each other.

The label comprises four awards: one, two, three or four flowers, according to the efforts of the municipality. Each award is given according to strict criteria. The  (Golden Flower) is a special prize awarded to a small number of applicants. Labelled communes display their flowers on road signs at their entrances. There are some 4,931 awarded cities, towns and villages (2018). 257 of them have four flowers.

History
The  originates in the various horticultural contests that appeared at the beginning of the 20th century. As tourism was growing, competitions were created for train stations and hotels for them to improve their visual quality. The French Touring Club created the first competition dedicated to villages during the 1920s. Called  ('cosy villages contest') it existed until 1939. After the Second World War, the Touring Club created an itinerary of flower-decked roads together with the Horticultural Association and the magazine Rustica. The success of the itinerary led to the creation of the present  in 1959. The competition passed from the French state to a national committee in 1972. Since 1988, its organisation has been the responsibility of the general councils which are the elected assemblies of the departments. The national committee remains the coordinator on a national level.

Principles
At the beginning, the competition was about the aesthetics of green spaces and floral displays. Nowadays, it focuses more on general planning and how it improves the lives of local residents and the experience of visitors.

Communes that apply for the label are first selected by their department which transmit the application to the regional council. The latter attributes the lowest awards (1, 2 and 3 flowers). The best applications are then submitted to the national committee who can attribute the 4 flowers and extra awards. Boards of examiners are formed on departmental, regional and national levels. Their members are usually municipal councilors, municipal clerks, horticulturists, gardeners, landscape architects, tourist office officials and representatives of various associations.

Criteria

The  awards its labels according to strict criteria. They help examiners to evaluate the motivation of the local authorities, the development they expect through plants and green spaces, how they communicate to the public about it, how they respect the environment and so forth.

The evaluation grid comprises a number of questions which can be answered by "non-existent", "initiated", "realised" and "confronted". The answer to each question determines a level between zero and four flowers. For instance, a question asks if the locality displays flowers and plants all year round; if it is "initiated", it can pretend to one or two flowers, if it is "realised", to three, and "confronted" four flowers. The average of all the answers moderated by the general impression of the examiners determine which label the locality is awarded.

International competition

The  has initiated a European competition called Entente Florale Europe ("Europe Floral Harmony"). It started in 1975 between Great Britain and France and has since expanded to include all members of the European Union and the EFTA. As of 2015, Austria, Belgium, Croatia, the Czech Republic, Germany, Hungary, the Republic of Ireland, Italy, the Netherlands, Slovenia and the United Kingdom are full members of the Entente. During this annual competition, each country submits a candidate locality. The best one is awarded a prize.

See also
 Britain in Bloom
 Tourism in France
 French towns and lands of Art and History
 Les Plus Beaux Villages de France

References

External links

 Website of the competition (in French)

Tourism in France
1959 establishments in France
Organizations established in 1959
Lists of most beautiful villages
Gardening in France